Stemona australiana is a plant species native to tropical south-east Asia, including northern Australia and Papua New Guinea. It grows as a herb or climber up to two metres high.

It was first published by George Bentham in 1878 under the name Roxburghia javanica var. australiana, indicating that it was considered a variety of the plant now known as Stemona javanica. In 1896 Charles Henry Wright transferred it into Stemona, a name for the genus which had priority over Roxburghia, at the same time promoting it to species rank as Stemona australiana.

References

Stemonaceae
Monocots of Australia
Flora of Western Australia
Flora of the Northern Territory
Flora of Queensland
Flora of Papua New Guinea
Plants described in 1878